Filippo Massarenghi, C.O. (8 February 1640 – 5 June 1688) was a Roman Catholic prelate who served as Bishop of Bitonto (1686–1688).

Biography
Filippo Massarenghi was born in Naples, Italy in 1640. On 13 May 1686, he was appointed during the papacy of Pope Innocent XI as Bishop of Bitonto. On 19 May 1686, he was consecrated bishop by Alessandro Crescenzi (cardinal), Cardinal-Priest of Santa Prisca, with Pier Antonio Capobianco, Bishop Emeritus of Lacedonia, and Francesco Onofrio Hodierna, Bishop of Bitetto, serving as co-consecrators. He served as Bishop of Bitonto until his death on 5 June 1688.

References

External links and additional sources
 (for Chronology of Bishops)
 (for Chronology of Bishops)

17th-century Italian Roman Catholic bishops
Bishops appointed by Pope Innocent XI
1640 births
1688 deaths
Bishops of Bitonto